Barry's Tea is an Irish tea company founded in 1901 by James J. Barry in Cork. Until the 1960s, tea was sold from a shop in Prince's Street, but thereafter the company expanded its wholesaling and distribution operations. There is a common debate among Irish households about which is the superior Irish tea; Barry's Tea or Lyons Tea.

History
By the mid-1980s Barry's Tea had become a national brand. According to their website, they are currently responsible for 38% of all tea sales in the Irish market (which is worth an estimated €85 million annually). Today, Barry's Tea is also available in the United Kingdom, Spain, and in some areas of Canada, Australia, France, Luxembourg and the United States where there are significant Irish immigrant communities.

Members of the Barry family been elected representatives for Fine Gael: the founder's son Anthony Barry  (TD 1954–57 and 1961–65), Anthony's son Peter Barry (TD 1969–97) and Peter's daughter Deirdre Clune (TD 1997–2001 and 2007–11, and MEP since 2014).

Controversies
In May 2018, it was revealed that many of Barry's Tea teabags are made with  polypropylene, a non-compostable plastic which is damaging to the environment. As of August 2021, the company claimed that it had responded to consumer pressure and had made 100% of its teabags biodegradable. 

Barry's Tea was a major sponsor of the greyhound racing industry in Ireland. Despite numerous calls for the company to desist, it had refused to cease its sponsorship of an industry which had been the subject of repeated investigations into  animal cruelty. As of July 2019, the sponsorship has been pulled indefinitely.

See also
 List of Irish companies

References

External links
Official Website
US Website

Food companies of the Republic of Ireland
Tea brands in Ireland